Sir Thomas Gregory Foster (10 June 1866 – 24 September 1931) was the Provost of University College London from 1904 to 1929, and Vice-Chancellor of the University of London from 1928 to 1930.

Early life
He was born in London and attended University College School and graduated from University College London (UCL) in 1888 with a degree in English. He obtained a PhD from Strasbourg University in 1892 with his dissertation on the Anglo-Saxon poem Judith (Judith: studies in metre, language and style, with a view to determining the date of the Oldenglish fragment and the home of its author).

Career
He first taught at UCL became a professor of English language and literature at Bedford College, London before returning to UCL where he spent 25 years in administration as secretary, principal and later provost. As Vice-Chancellor of the University of London he was instrumental in having the new university building established in central London at Bloomsbury rather than Holland Park in west London.

Personal life
He was knighted in 1917 and created a baronet in 1930. In 1894 he married Fanny Maude (d.1928) and they had two sons and two daughters. He died in Hove, Sussex in 1931 and his second wife later the same year.

See also
List of Vice-Chancellors of the University of London
List of British university chancellors and vice-chancellors

References 

Alumni of University College London
1931 deaths
1866 births
Academics of University College London
People educated at University College School
Academics of Bedford College, London
Vice-Chancellors of the University of London
University of Strasbourg alumni
Provosts of University College London
Baronets in the Baronetage of the United Kingdom
Knights Bachelor